The Cordeaux River, a perennial river of the Hawkesbury-Nepean catchment, is located in the Southern Highlands and Macarthur regions of New South Wales, Australia.

Course
The Cordeaux River rises on the western slopes of the Illawarra escarpment, below Mount Keira within the Wollongong local government area and flows generally north and northwest, joined by the Avon River, before reaching its confluence with the Nepean River, south of Wilton. The river descends  over its  course.

The river is impounded by Lake Cordeaux, one of four reservoirs within the Upper Nepean Scheme that supplies potable water for greater metropolitan Sydney.

Locality
The "address locality" of Cordeaux is defined as a suburb of the City of Wollongong, "lying beside the Cordeaux River between Lake Cordeaux and Upper Cordeaux No 1 Dam".

See also

List of rivers of Australia
List of rivers of New South Wales (A–K)
Rivers of New South Wales
Upper Nepean Scheme

References

Rivers of New South Wales
Macarthur (New South Wales)
Southern Highlands (New South Wales)
City of Wollongong
Wollondilly Shire